Green Green may refer to:
 Green Green (video game), a 2001 Japanese H-game for computer
 Green Green (anime), a 2003 Japanese 13-episode anime adaptation
 Green, Green, a 1963 hit single by The New Christy Minstrels
 Gringrin or Green Green, a character in the 1969 novel Isle of the Dead by Roger Zelazny